Thryptomene naviculata is a species of flowering plant in the family Myrtaceae and is endemic to central areas of Western Australia. It is a rounded shrub with overlapping, decussate, egg-shaped leaves with the narrower end towards the base and white flowers with five petals and five stamens.

Description
The central disc of the flower is pale yellowish brown and there are five stamens. Flowering occurs between May and September.

Taxonomy
Thryptomene naviculata was first formally described in 1980 by John Green in the journal Nuytsia from specimens collected by A.S. Mitchell near Karara Well on the Canning Stock Route in 1979. The specific epithet (naviculata) means "like a small boat", referring to the shape of the leaves.

Distribution and habitat
This thryptomene grows on sand dunes in low, open shrubland in the Little Sandy Desert in the Pilbara region of Western Australia.

References

naviculata
Endemic flora of Western Australia
Rosids of Western Australia
Plants described in 1980